The Iron Cross is a 1914 German silent film directed by Richard Oswald and starring Friedrich Kühne, Hedda Vernon, and Hanni Weisse. It marked the directorial debut of Oswald.

It was shot at the Tempelhof Studios.

Despite its patriotic name, the film was seized by the German authorities and all its copies were destroyed due to the film's pacifist nature.

Cast
Friedrich Kühne
Hedda Vernon
Hanni Weisse
Felix Basch
Erwin Fichtner

References

External links

Films of the German Empire
German silent short films
Films directed by Richard Oswald
German black-and-white films
Films shot at Tempelhof Studios
1914 drama films
German drama films
Silent drama films
1910s German films